is a Japanese corporation which is the inventor, manufacturer, and distributor of the RISO Printer-Duplicator, a.k.a. Risograph.  This device automatically creates a stencil-type master (from a paper original or digital file), thereby enabling it reproduce single-colour documents at high speed and low cost, in a machine that has a small footprint and a relatively low purchase price.
  
The firm was established in Tokyo, Japan, where it continues to maintain its headquarters today.  With sales in over 150 countries, Riso is a billion-dollar company.  The company maintains a foundation that donates equipment around the world primarily to educational institutions.
  
In Japanese, 'Riso' means 'ideal' and the word 'Kagaku' means 'science.'
 
Noboru Hayama, the company's founder, started his business by mixing inks at his kitchen sink just after World War II, and in 1946 established a mimeograph printing company, whose first product was its signature duplicator. Over the next few years, Mr. Hayama expanded his company to the area of manufactured emulsion inks, stencil masters, and other duplicating products.

Sponsorships
The company sponsors the J.League football club Kashima Antlers with the RISO logo appearing on the back of the club's shirt.

See also

Gocco

References

External links
 Riso Kagaku Japanese homepage
 Riso Kagaku English homepage
 US Riso Kagaku homepage
 United Kingdom Direct division homepage
(in German) RISO (Deutschland) GmbH homepage

Computer printer companies
Technology companies of Japan
Electronics companies of Japan
Manufacturing companies based in Tokyo
Companies listed on the Tokyo Stock Exchange
Electronics companies established in 1946
Japanese companies established in 1946
Japanese brands